Condylostylus flavipes is a species in the family Dolichopodidae ("longlegged flies"), in the order Diptera ("flies").

References

Further reading

External links
Diptera.info
NCBI Taxonomy Browser, Condylostylus flavipes

Sciapodinae
Insects described in 1904
Taxa named by John Merton Aldrich